Ones may refer to:

 Ones (album), by Selena, 2002
 The Ones, New York electronica group
 "The Ones" (30 Rock), an episode of 30 Rock
 In music, single bars of alternating solos (as in "trading ones"); see Rhythm section#Musical roles

See also
 One (disambiguation)
 Number 1's (disambiguation)
 Onesie (disambiguation)